Clément Castelli (14 January 1870 – 1959) was a French painter.

Biography
Clément Castelli was born on 14 January 1870 in Premia, Italy. He was a member of the Mountain Painters Society. He moved to Paris in 1880, and studied under Jules Adler and Léon Bellemont. Clément Castelli spent most of his career painting mountains in the French Alps, in Italy, and in Switzerland. Clément Castelli has exhibited his works for many years at the Salon des Artistes Indépendants and at the Salon des Artistes Français.

Bibliography
 Clément Castelli, mountains painter, Collection des cahiers de l'art contemporain, #28, Paris
 Clément Castelli, biography by Marcel Fromenteau, lauréat de l'Académie Française, Paris, 1937
 Bénézit Dictionary of French Artists

References

External links
 artnet photos of Clément Castelli's artworks

1870 births
1959 deaths
People from the Province of Verbano-Cusio-Ossola
19th-century French painters
French male painters
20th-century French painters
20th-century French male artists
Modern painters
19th-century French male artists